Robert Morin (born May 20, 1949) is a Canadian film director, screenwriter, and cinematographer. In 2009, he received Governor General's Award in Visual and Media Arts.

Biography
Robert Morin is known for his very personal, dark, and pessimistic "interior views" of family, crime, law enforcement, and human suffering. He studied Literature and Communications and in 1971 began to work as a cameraman, joining ORTQ in Rimouski, where he directed films and videos. In 1977, with a group of friends and colleagues, Morin founded La Coopérative de Production Vidéo de Montréal, where he continues to produce his own work. After creating close to 30 short films with his colleagues over 10 years, he directed his first feature-length film Tristesse modèle réduit in 1987. His film Requiem pour un beau sans-coeur was nominated for the Genie Awards for Best Motion Picture and Best Director.

Filmography

Feature films
Scale-Model Sadness (Tristesse modèle réduit) - 1987
 (La réception) - 1989
Requiem for a Handsome Bastard (Requiem pour un beau sans-coeur) - 1992
Windigo - 1994
 - 1994
Whoever Dies, Dies in Pain (Quiconque meurt, meurt à douleur) - 1998
Opération Cobra - 2001
The Negro (Le nèg') - 2002
Yule Croak (Petit Pow! Pow! Noël) - 2005
May God Bless America (Que Dieu bénisse l'Amérique) - 2006
Daddy Goes Ptarmigan Hunting (Papa à la chasse aux lagopèdes) - 2008
Diary of an Aid Worker (Journal d'un coopérant) - 2010
The Four Soldiers (Les Quatre Soldats) - 2013
3 Indian Tales (3 histoires d'Indiens) - 2014
Heaven Sent (Un Paradis pour tous) - 2016
Infiltration (Le problème d’infiltration) - 2017

Short films
La femme étrangère (The Woman from Elsewhere) (Documentary co-directed with Lorraine Dufour, 1988)
Le voleur vit en enfer (The Thief Lives in Hell) (Short film co-directed with Lorraine Dufour, 1984)
Mauvais mal (Evil Madness) (Short film co-directed with Lorraine Dufour, 1984)
On se paye la gomme (We Treat Ourselves to the Best) (Short film co-directed with Marcel Chouinard, 1984)
Toi t'es-tu lucky (And You, Are You Lucky?) (Short film co-directed with Lorraine Dufour, 1984)
Le mystérieux Paul (The Mysterious Paul) (Short film co-directed with Lorraine Dufour, 1983)
A Postcard from Victoria (Short film co-directed with Lorraine Dufour, 1983)
Ma richesse a cause mes privations (My Wealth Caused My Deprivations) (Short film co-directed with Lorraine Dufour, 1982)
Il a gagné ses épaulettes (He Won His Wings) (Documentary  co-directed with Lorraine Dufour, 1981)
Gus est encore dans l'armée (Gus Is Still in the Army) (Short film co-directed with Lorraine Dufour, 1980)
Ma vie c'est pour le restant de mes jours (My Life Is for the Rest of my Life) (Short film co-directed with Lorraine Dufour, 1980)
Le royaume est commencé (The Kingdom Has Come) (Short film co-directed with Lorraine Dufour, 1980)
Même mort il faut s'organiser (Even Dead You Have To Get Organized) (Short film, 1977)

References

External links

Robert Morin - The Canadian Encyclopedia

1949 births
Living people
French Quebecers
20th-century Canadian screenwriters
21st-century Canadian screenwriters
Canadian cinematographers
Film directors from Montreal
Writers from Montreal
Prix Albert-Tessier winners
Canadian screenwriters in French
Canadian male screenwriters
Governor General's Award in Visual and Media Arts winners